Muhammad Rashid or Muhammad Rashid may refer to:

People
 Muhammad Rashid (long jumper) (born 1935), Pakistani Olympic athlete
 Muhammad Rashid (field hockey) (fl. 2010), Pakistani field hockey player
 Mohammed Rashid (born 1995), Palestinian footballer

Other uses
 Moḩammad Rashīd, another name for the Iranian village Talkhab-e Dishmuk

See also
 Mohammad Rashed, Kuwaiti footballer
 Mohamed Rashed Daoud Al-Owhali, British-born Saudi terrorist
 Muhammad Rashid Khan, Pakistani athlete
 Mohammad Rashid Khilji, Pakistani politician
 Mohammad Rashid Mazaheri, Iranian footballer
 Muhammad Rashid Pasha, Ottoman statesman
 Muhammad Rashid Rida, Syrian-Egyptian Islamic scholar and reformer
 Muhammad Rashid Shah, Pakistani politician